Michael Zielenziger (born June 28, 1955) is an American journalist and author, and a visiting scholar at the Institute of International Studies, University of California, Berkeley.

Works
Shutting Out the Sun : How Japan Created Its Own Lost Generation, Nan A. Talese - Random House, published September 2006; paperback - Vintage Departures, published September 2007; Japanese edition - Kodansha, June 2007.

References
Biographical text provided by the publisher

1955 births
Living people
People from Freeport, New York
20th-century American journalists
American male journalists